CLEC4C is a membrane protein of plasmacytoid dendritic cells used as a marker for this kind of cells and denoted as CD303 in the nomenclature of the Cluster of differentiation.

References

External links
 

C-type lectins